The Nokia 6650 fold (also known as the 6650d) is a Nokia smartphone announced in March 2008, running Symbian OS. It is a Hex-band unit using GSM 850, 900, 1,800, and 1,900 MHz networks and UMTS 850 and 2,100 Mhz networks (WCDMA/ HSDPA). Also noted as a quad-band clamshell 3G smartphone, it was released in June 2008.  It was sold through AT&T Mobility in the U.S.  It is AT&T's replacement for the S60-powered N75.  It was manufactured in three colors, metallic silver, black, and red. It was never a global model, and therefore it was sold exclusively for T-mobile networks in Europe. Models were RM-324 for North America and RM-400 for Europe.

AT&T Variant 
The AT&T variant has been heavily modified from the T-Mobile versions. It has model number 6650d-1bH with software version RM-324. The keypad has been modified, adding MediaNet (just a shortcut to the standard S60 web browser, based on Webkit), GPS, and camera keys, and moving the menu and clear keys below the send and end keys, respectively.

Also, the software has been modified to accommodate AT&T. Carrier branding is evident throughout the OS, and several applications have been changed. Nokia Maps has been replaced by AT&T Navigator, and FM Radio has been removed for XM Radio. There are also non-removable demos of Tetris, Mobile Banking, MobiTV, The Weather Channel, Midnight Pool 3D, and Diner Dash 2 have been added. The main menu also features links to Cellular Video, Yellowpages, Media Net, AT&T Mall, AT&T Music, and AT&T GPS.

The AT&T Variant is only available in silver and red.

Reference

External links 
Nokia 6650 fold Product Support at Nokia Europe

Mobile phones introduced in 2008
Nokia smartphones